Daphnella pernobilis is a species of sea snail, a marine gastropod mollusk in the family Raphitomidae.

Description
The length of the shell attains 17 mm.

Distribution
This marine species is found in the Northwest Pacific ocean off the coast of Japan.

References

External links
 
 Snailtaiwan : image of Daphnella pernobilis

pernobilis
Gastropods described in 1962